Yabaâna (Yabaána, Yabahana) is an extinct Arawakan language of Brazil.

References

Arawakan languages
Languages of Brazil
Extinct languages of South America